Burglar is a 1987 Canadian-American comedy film directed by Hugh Wilson and distributed by Warner Bros. The film stars Whoopi Goldberg and Bobcat Goldthwait.

Plot
Bernice "Bernie" Rhodenbarr, a former San Francisco burglar, resumes her life of crime when a corrupt police officer named Ray Kirschman blackmails her.

A dentist, Dr. Cynthia Sheldrake, hires Bernice to break into her ex-husband Christopher's home and steal back her jewelry. Things take a turn for the worse when Christopher is murdered while Bernie is robbing his home, and thanks to Sheldrake and her lawyer Carson, Bernie is the only suspect.

To clear her name Bernice and her friend Carl hop from bar to bar looking for someone who knew Christopher. They find out that Christopher had quite a few girlfriends... and boyfriends. Bernice has three new suspects after an old flame of Christopher's tells her about an artist, a bartender, and a mysterious man known only by his nickname: "Heeeeeeere's Johnny!"

Bernice investigates the artist and the bartender only to have them show up dead. With no clues or witnesses, Bernice waits for Dr. Sheldrake in her home to confront her. Demanding she tell her everything she knew about Christopher, she concludes that Cynthia herself had sex with her ex the night he was murdered.

During the conversation the TV flashes to an episode of The Tonight Show Starring Johnny Carson. Bernice realizes Carson knew the doctor's ex. Bernice calls Carson to meet her in the park with the bag of jewelry Bernice was commissioned to steal in the first place. Bernice has also deduced that Carson was in love with Christopher himself. A scuffle ensues and Bernice, along with her friend Carl and Ray, capture Carson.

Cast
 Whoopi Goldberg as Bernice "Bernie" Rhodenbarr
 Bobcat Goldthwait as Carl Hefler
 G. W. Bailey as Ray Kirschman
 Lesley Ann Warren as Dr. Cynthia Sheldrake
 James Handy as Carson "Johnny" Verrill
 Anne De Salvo as Detective Todras
 John Goodman as Detective Nyswander
 Stephen Shellen as Christopher Marshall
 Elizabeth Ruscio as Frankie
 Vyto Ruginis as K.E. Graybow
 Larry Mintz as Vincent "Knobby" DiCarno
 Jo Anna March as Mrs. Kirschman 
 Raye Birk as The Jogger
 Nathan Davis as Mr. Paggif, Pawnshop Owner
 Spike Sorrentino as Chief of Detectives
 Eric Poppick as Deliveryman
 Scott Lincoln as Man In Cadillac
 Thom Bray as Shoplifter In Bookstore
 Gary Hershberger as Young Officer
 Mike Pniewski as Man In Grey Uniform #1
 Ethan Phillips as Barman (uncredited)

Production
The film was adapted from the 1978 novel The Burglar in the Closet by Lawrence Block; in Block's book, Bernie Rhodenbarr is a white man living in New York. It was also the first R-rated and live-action production from the Canadian animation company Nelvana.

In a 2013 interview with Kevin Smith, screenwriter Jeph Loeb disclosed that Burglar was initially intended to be a serious vehicle for Bruce Willis with Whoopi Goldberg filling the role of the character's neighbor. (The film was based on the second of a long-running series of novels about a professional burglar, Bernard "Bernie" Rhodenbar.) When Willis dropped out, Goldberg took on the lead role.

Reception
Critical reception was largely negative. Roger Ebert described the film as "a witless, hapless exercise in the wrong way to package Goldberg. This is a woman who is original. Who is talented. Who has a special relationship with the motion picture comedy. It is criminal to put her into brain-damaged, assembly-line thrillers." On Rotten Tomatoes, the film has an aggregate score of 27% based on 3 positive and 8 negative critic reviews.

See also
 List of American films of 1987
 List of Nelvana franchises

References

External links

 
 
 
 
 
 

1987 films
1980s crime comedy films
1987 LGBT-related films
American LGBT-related films
American crime comedy films
English-language Canadian films
1980s English-language films
Films based on American novels
Films based on crime novels
Films directed by Hugh Wilson
Warner Bros. films
Films set in San Francisco
Films set in the San Francisco Bay Area
Films shot in San Francisco
Films scored by Sylvester Levay
Nelvana films
Canadian comedy films
Films with screenplays by Hugh Wilson
1987 comedy films
Films with screenplays by Jeph Loeb
1980s American films
1980s Canadian films
Canadian LGBT-related films
LGBT-related comedy films